"Don't Come Cryin' to Me" is a song co-written and recorded by American country music artist Vince Gill. It was released in January 1999 as the third single from the album The Key. The song reached No. 27 on the Billboard Hot Country Singles & Tracks chart.  The song was written by Gill and Reed Nielsen.

Chart performance

References

1999 singles
1998 songs
Vince Gill songs
Songs written by Vince Gill
Songs written by Reed Nielsen
Song recordings produced by Tony Brown (record producer)
MCA Nashville Records singles